Pirkko Nieminen (born 23 March 1939) is a Finnish gymnast. She competed in six events at the 1960 Summer Olympics.

References

1939 births
Living people
Finnish female artistic gymnasts
Olympic gymnasts of Finland
Gymnasts at the 1960 Summer Olympics
Gymnasts from Tampere
20th-century Finnish women